Acanthopolymastia acanthoxa is a species of sea sponge belonging to the family Polymastiidae. It is a deep-ocean species found on muddy substrates at depths of over 3000 m in the Ross Sea, Antarctica.

This is a brown cushion-shaped sponge up to 4 cm across with a lateral fringe and a single papilla with a terminal opening.

References

Sponges described in 1964
Polymastiidae